The  is, as are the Izumi school and the Sagi school, a school of kyogen, a form of traditional Japanese comic theater. Kyogen of Ōkura school uses an older form of Japanese language than does Izumi. Their kyogen preserves the sarugaku tradition.

References
 Ōkuraryū Wakate Kyōgen / SHIN (in Japanese)
 Kyōgen Ōkuraryū Zenchiku Tadaaki (in Japanese)

Theatre in Japan